Pontogeneus (nomen dubium) is a genus of extinct cetacean known from fossils recovered from Late Eocene sediments (Bartonian-Priabonian stages) of the southeastern United States (most notably Alabama and Florida).

Classification

When "Zeuglodon" brachyspondylus was formerly included, Pontogeneus was depicted as having a skeleton similar to that of Basilosaurus cetoides, although the posterior thoracic vertebrae, the lumbar vertebrae, and the anterior caudal vertebrae had proportions closer to those seen in members of the archaeocete Subfamily Dorudontinae.

Taxonomic history
In 1852, Joseph Leidy had erected Pontogeneus priscus based on the centrum of a single cervical vertebra in the collections of the Academy of Natural Sciences in Philadelphia. Leidy noted that the centrum had been collected from exposures along the Washita River in Louisiana.  synonymized these two taxa to form Pontogeneus brachyspondylus which he listed as incertae sedis.

 designated Pontogeneus priscus and Zeuglodon brachyspondylus to be nomina dubia based on the lack of diagnostic characters that distinguish the type specimens from other basilosaurids. While Pontogeneus priscus is no longer considered valid, "Z." brachyspondylus appears similar to Masracetus from Egypt (which was also referred to Z. brachyspondylus in the past) and may represent either a species of Masracetus or a distinct and closely related but as-yet-unnamed genus.

Formerly assigned to Pontogeneus
"Zeuglodon brachyspondylus" was erected for several vertebrae collected in either Choctaw or Washington counties in southern Alabama.

Basilosaurid remains from Egypt were tentatively assigned to Zeuglodon brachyspondylus based on superficial similarities to the syntype series (under the old hypothesis of synonymy of Pontogeneus and Zeuglodon brachyspondylus). However, these remains were given their own genus, Masracetus, given minor differences from "Z." brachyspondylus.

Notes

References

 
 
 
 
 
 

Basilosauridae
Eocene cetaceans
Archaeoceti
Eocene mammals of North America
Prehistoric cetacean genera
Nomina dubia